John of Glastonbury (fl. ) was a Benedictine monk and chronicler. His real name may have been John Seen.

In the mid fourteenth century John wrote the Cronica Sive Antiquitates Glastoniensis Ecclesie (Chronicles or Antiquities of the Glastonbury Church) which is a chronicle of Glastonbury Abbey, from when it was founded, up to the period of John's life. The Cronica survives as a full text over seven manuscripts. The Cronica refers to the Arthurian legends several times, and John drew extensively on De Antiquitate Glastonie Ecclesie by William of Malmesbury.

References

Bibliography 

 

Benedictine scholars